V. S. Sunil Kumar (born 30 May 1967) is an Indian politician and the former Minister for Agriculture, Kerala.
In 2011, he was elected from Kaipamangalam constituency and in 2016, from Thrissur constituency to Kerala Legislative Assembly.

He is a member of the Communist Party of India. He started his political career with All India Students' Federation at time of his high school life. He is an alumnus of Sree Kerala Varma College, Thrissur and completed his LL.B from Kerala Law Academy Law College, Thiruvananthapuram. He was holding different posts in AISF State and National level and in 1998, was the National Secretary.

Personal life

He is born to V. S. Subrahmannian and C. K. Premavathy. He is married to Adv. Rekha and has a son Niranjan Krishna.

References

External links

Living people
1967 births
Malayali politicians
People from Thrissur district
Sree Kerala Varma College alumni
Communist Party of India politicians from Kerala
Kerala MLAs 2006–2011
Kerala MLAs 2011–2016
Kerala MLAs 2016–2021